Tentaspina balii is a moth of the family Erebidae first described by Michael Fibiger in 2011. It is found in Indonesia (it was described from eastern Bali).

The wingspan is about 12.5 mm. The forewings are brownish grey, suffused with dark grey scales. The colour is blackish grey at the quadrangular upper, medial and terminal area and fringes. The costa is basally black, subapically with small black dots. The crosslines are untraceable except the terminal line which is indicated by black interveinal dots. The hindwings are grey with an indistinct discal spot. The underside of the forewings is unicolorous grey brown and the underside of the hindwings is grey with a discal spot.

References

Micronoctuini
Moths described in 2011
Taxa named by Michael Fibiger